The 1995 season is the 42nd year in Guangzhou Football Club's existence, their 28th season in the Chinese football league and the 2nd season in the professional football league.

Squad

Transfers

Winter

 In

 Out

Summer

 In

 Out

Match results

Friendly matches

Jia-A League

FA Cup

Round 1

References

1995
Guangzhou Apollo